"Rule the World" is a song by American rapper 2 Chainz featuring American singer Ariana Grande, released as the second single from the former's fifth studio album Rap or Go to the League on March 19, 2019. It samples "Why Don't We Fall in Love" by Amerie. It is Epps' and Grande's second collaboration, following the remix of "7 Rings", from Grande's fifth studio album, Thank U, Next (2019). It was nominated for a MTV Video Music Award for Best Hip-Hop Video in 2019.

Background
 
In January 2019, Grande released the single "7 Rings" from her fifth studio album Thank U, Next (2019). 2 Chainz pointed out the song's similarity to his own 2011 track "Spend It". The music video for "7 Rings" was also accused of stealing 2 Chainz's pink trap aesthetics used to promote Pretty Girls Like Trap Music (2017).

Later in the month, 2 Chainz and Grande met in person to squash the dispute. The meeting went well, ending with 2 Chainz recording the official remix to "7 Rings" and Grande providing featured vocals for "Rule the World".

Music video
A music video for "Rule the World" was released on March 11, 2019. The video, directed by Sebastian Sdaigui, features 2 Chainz and Grande at a luxurious 1920s club, singing the song alongside a band.

Commercial performance
Though met with critical acclaim, often being referred to as "R&B perfection", "Rule the World" debuted at number 94 on the Hot 100 following the release of the parent album, the only charting track of the LP. The song fell off the chart the following week but later re-entered the chart at number 98 in late May, spending a second week there.

Live performances
2 Chainz first performed "Rule the World" alongside Grande on March 20, 2019 during her Sweetener World Tour in Boston, MA. 2 Chainz performed the song live on Jimmy Kimmel Live! in April 2019. In May 2019, 2 Chainz performed the song alongside Amerie on The Ellen DeGeneres Show.

Credits and personnel
Credits adapted from Tidal.
2 Chainz – vocals, songwriter
Ariana Grande – vocals
Robert Watson – songwriter
Racquelle Anteola – songwriter
Moore Ray III – songwriter
Christopher Michael Brown – songwriter
Lerron Carson – songwriter
Richard Harrison – songwriter
Cardiak – producer, songwriter
Hitmaka – producer, songwriter
Paul Cabbin – producer
Rob Holladay – additional producer
Billy Hickey – recording engineer, studio personnel
Nolan Presley – recording engineer, studio personnel
Finis "KY" White – mixer, studio personnel
Serban Ghenea – mixer, studio personnel

Charts

Weekly charts

Year-end charts

Certifications

Release history

References

2019 songs
2 Chainz songs
Ariana Grande songs
Songs written by Hitmaka
Song recordings produced by Yung Berg
Def Jam Recordings singles